General Fox may refer to:

Alonzo Patrick Fox (1895–1984), U.S. Army lieutenant general
Charles R. Fox (1912–2006), West Virginia National Guard major general
Charles Richard Fox (1796–1873), British Army general
David G. Fox (fl. 1980s–2010s), U.S. Army brigadier general
Henry Edward Fox (1755–1811), British Army general
Jim Fox (Canadian Army officer) (fl. 1980s), Canadian Forces lieutenant general

See also
William Fox-Pitt (British Army officer) (1896–1988), British Army major general
Attorney General Fox (disambiguation)